The 2016 COSAFA Cup (known as Castle Lager COSAFA Cup Namibia 2016 for sponsorship reasons) was the 16th edition of the COSAFA Cup, an international football competition consisting of national teams of member nations of the Council of Southern Africa Football Associations (COSAFA).  Originally, it was to be held in Windhoek, Namibia during May 2016, however the tournament was rescheduled to avoid a clash with the South African Premier Soccer League and took place in June 2016.

Participating nations

Venues

Draw

The draw was originally scheduled to place on 25 April 2016. It was rescheduled for 28 April 2016 and televised on SuperSport's Soccer Africa show.

Squads

Group stage

Group A

Group B

Knockout stage

The two group stage winners qualified for this round.

Quarter-finals

Semi-finals

Third place play-off

Final

Plate

The losing quarter-finalists qualified for this round.

Semi-finals

Final

Goalscorers
5 goals

 Felix Badenhorst

3 goals

 Jane Thaba-Ntšo
 Gabadinho Mhango

2 goals

 Hendrik Somaeb
 Thabiso Kutumela
 Menzi Masuku
 Gift Motupa
 Lawrence Mhlanga
 Ronald Pfumbidzai

1 goal

 Onkabetse Makgantai
 Kabelo Seakanyeng
 Nelson Omba
 Hlompho Kalake
 Jeremea Kamela
 Tumelo Khutlang
 Basias Makepe
 Sera Motebang
 Phafa Tšosane
 Tojo Claudel Fanomezana
 Luis Dorza
 Andy Sophie
 Miracle Gabeya
 Deon Hotto
 Itamunua Keimuine
 Ronald Ketjijere
 Judas Moseamedi
 Gift Motupa
 Lebogang Phiri
 Njabulo Ndlovu
 Wonder Nhleko
 Sabelo Ndzinisa
 Tony Tsabedze
 Paul Katema
 Spencer Sautu
 Charles Zulu
 Teenage Hadebe
 Marshal Mudehwe
 Obadiah Tarumbwa

1 own goal

 Angula da Costa (playing against Botswana)

References

External links
Official site

2016
2016 in African football
International association football competitions hosted by Namibia
2016 in Namibian sport